Hamster Jam (1991) was The Hamsters second CD but first live CD only release. It was recorded live with no overdubs.

Track listing
 "Only Rock 'n' Roll" – 3:33
 "The Gangster of Love" – 5:49
 "Manic Depression" – 3:29
 "Cadillac Walk" – 4:47
 "Highway Chile" – 3:48
 "Ju Ju Man" – 3:06
 "Your Cash Ain't Nothin' But Trash" – 5:04
 "Crosstown Traffic" – 2:47
 "Wild Thing" – 3:32
 "The Queen" – 0:48
 "Crossroads" – 3:32
 "Red House" – 6:22
 "Can't Stop Rockin'" – 3:42
 "Barefoot Rock" – 3:30
 "Romeo's Escape" – 3:56

Musicians
 Snail's-Pace Slim —- guitars, vocals.
 Rev Otis Elevator —- drums, vocals.
 Ms Zsa Zsa Poltergeist —- bass, vocals.

Production
 Recorded and mixed by Richard Willis.
 Recorded live at JB's Dudley, West Midlands.
 Cover design by Snail's-Pace Slim.
 Cadillac design by Des Penny.

External links
 Bluesrockers' review of Hamster Jam

The Hamsters albums
1990 live albums